Leonel Ezequiel Müller (born 13 May 1996) is an Argentine professional footballer who plays as a left-back for Tristán Suárez.

Career
Müller started his footballing career with Los Toritos, prior to joining Banfield's system in 2008. Years later, Huracán signed Müller following a successful trial. He was promoted into the first-team of Huracán during the 2016 Argentine Primera División season, subsequently making his professional debut against Unión Santa Fe on 13 May. In 2018, having only appeared once more since his club bow, Müller was loaned out to Primera B Metropolitana's Sacachispas on 9 January. He was selected seventeen times during 2017–18. In total, Müller played fifty-two times whilst also netting his first senior goal - against Comunicaciones.

On 20 June 2019, Müller agreed a permanent move to Defensores de Belgrano ahead of 2019–20. In February 2021, Müller moved to Tristán Suárez.

Career statistics
.

References

External links

1996 births
Living people
Sportspeople from Buenos Aires Province
Argentine footballers
Association football defenders
Argentine Primera División players
Primera B Metropolitana players
Club Atlético Huracán footballers
Sacachispas Fútbol Club players
Defensores de Belgrano footballers
CSyD Tristán Suárez footballers
Argentine people of Volga German descent